Hormurus waigiensis, also known as the Australian rainforest scorpion, is a species of scorpion in the Hormuridae family. It is native to Australia and New Guinea. It was first described in 1844 by French paleontologist and zoologist Paul Gervais.

Description
The scorpions can grow to about 65 mm in length. They have elongated and flattened bodies as well as powerful pincers.

Distribution and habitat
Much of the species’ recorded range in Australia is in eastern Queensland, with some additional records from New South Wales, the Northern Territory, northern Western Australia, and New Guinea. As their common name suggests, the scorpions prefer warm and humid environments. Their body shape is adapted to sheltering in rock crevices and beneath decaying bark and plant litter.

References

 

 
waigiensis
Scorpions of Australia
Arthropods of New Guinea
Fauna of New South Wales
Fauna of the Northern Territory
Fauna of Queensland
Fauna of Western Australia
Animals described in 1844
Taxa named by Paul Gervais